Saigawa Dam might refer to

Saigawa Dam (Ishikawa Prefecture), a dam in Ishikawa Prefecture, Japan.
Saigawa Dam (Nagano Prefecture), a dam in Nagano Prefecture, Japan.